John Patrick Boles (January 21, 1930 – October 9, 2014) was an American Roman Catholic titular bishop of Nova Sparsa and auxiliary bishop of the Archdiocese of Boston, Massachusetts.

Life
Born in Boston, Massachusetts, Boles was ordained a priesthood for the Boston Archdiocese on February 2, 1955. On April 14, 1992, Boles was appointed bishop and was ordained bishop on May 21, 1992. Boles retired on October 12, 2006. He died on October 9, 2014, in Framingham, Massachusetts, aged 84.

References

1930 births
2014 deaths
Clergy from Boston
21st-century American Roman Catholic titular bishops
American Roman Catholic clergy of Irish descent
20th-century American Roman Catholic titular bishops